Grenadine Airways is an airline based in Saint Vincent and the Grenadines.

Services
Mustique
Union Island
Canouan
St Vincent
Barbados
Martinique
Grenada
St. Barths
Saint Martin
Saint Lucia

References

External links
Grenadine Airways

Airlines of Saint Vincent and the Grenadines